Janet Penn is an American Paralympic skier, specialized in para-alpine skiing and para-Nordic skiing. She represented the United States at the 1980 Winter Paralympics, 1984 Winter Paralympics, and 1988 Winter Paralympics. She won three medals in alpine skiing: a  gold medal and two bronze medals.

Career 

At the 1980 Winter Paralympics, in Geilo, Penn won bronze in alpine skiing, the 2A giant slalom race;  she placed her third with the time of 2:46.91, behind the Canadians Lana Spreeman with 2: 39.60 and Lorna Manzer in 2: 46.88.

Four years later, at the 1980 Winter Paralympics, in Innsbruck, Penn took the gold medal in the slalom LW4 with a time of 1:30.00, (silver for Reinhild Möller in 1: 43.55 and bronze for Elisabeth Zerobin in 1: 43.99  ). Penn was third in the LW4 giant slalom race, with 1:45.85,  behind German Reinhild Möller with 1: 36.24 and Canadian Lana Spreeman with 1: 39.18.

She also competed in Paralympic Nordic skiing at the 1988 Winter Paralympics in Innsbruck, without reaching the podium. She finished 4th in the 5 km short-distance race LW3 / 4/9 (behind the Canadian Francine Lemire , the German Anneliese Tenzler and the Swiss Monika Waelti  ), and 5th place over the long distance 10 km LW3 / 4 / 9 (in front of her Francine Lemire, Anneliese Tenzler, Monika Waelti and the Austrian Gisela Danzl ) .

References 

Paralympic gold medalists for the United States
Living people
Year of birth missing (living people)
Place of birth missing (living people)
Paralympic alpine skiers of the United States
American female alpine skiers